Alan Bates (birth registered fourth ¼ 1944) is a former professional rugby league footballer who played in the 1960s and 1970s.

Background
Alan Bates' birth was registered in Dewsbury district, West Riding of Yorkshire, England.

Playing career

International honours
Alan Bates won caps for Great Britain while at Dewsbury in 1974 against France (2 matches), and New Zealand (sub) (2 matches).

Championship final appearances
Alan Bates played  in Dewsbury's 22-13 victory over Leeds in the Championship Final during the 1972–73 season at Odsal Stadium, Bradford on Saturday 19 May 1973.

County Cup Final appearances
Alan Bates played , and scored 3-goals in Dewsbury's 9-36 defeat by Leeds in the 1972–73 Yorkshire County Cup Final during the 1972–73 season at Odsal Stadium, Bradford on Saturday 7 October 1972.

BBC2 Floodlit Trophy Final appearances
Alan Bates played  in Dewsbury's 2-22 defeat by St. Helens in the 1975 BBC2 Floodlit Trophy Final during the 1975-76 season at Knowsley Road, St. Helens on Tuesday 16 December 1975.

Testimonial match
Alan Bates' Testimonial match at Dewsbury took place in 1976.

Genealogical information
Alan Bates is the brother of the rugby league footballer who played in the 1960s and 1970s for Great Britain (non-Test matches), and Dewsbury, John Bates.

References

External links
!Great Britain Statistics at englandrl.co.uk (statistics currently missing due to not having appeared for both Great Britain, and England)
Photograph Of 'Neil Fox' at rlhp.co.uk

1944 births
Living people
Dewsbury Rams players
English rugby league players
Great Britain national rugby league team players
Huddersfield Giants players
Oldham R.L.F.C. players
Rugby league halfbacks
Rugby league players from Dewsbury